Punchdrunk is a British theatre company, formed in 2000 by Felix Barrett.

The company developed a form of immersive theatre in which no audience member will have the same experience as another. The audience is free to choose what to watch and where to go. The format is related to promenade theatre, but utilizes audience immersion more extensively. The company's way of using sound, light, movement, and environment in such ways while merging mass spectacle with intimate audience experiences, has garnered major recognition for being so unique. In 2015, Punchdrunk formed a new company, Punchdrunk International, which produces a selection of Punchdrunk's commercial productions for national and international audiences.

The company is a National Portfolio Organisation with Arts Council England.

Punchdrunk International 
In 2015, Punchdrunk founded a new production company, Punchdrunk International. Felix Barrett serves as the Artistic Director of Punchdrunk International. Company members include Creative Producer Colin Nightingale, Creative Director Stephen Dobbie and Design Director Livi Vaughan.

The company has also collaborated with selected organisations, including a long term creative partnership with Samsung North America. Projects made in collaboration with the company include Believe Your Eyes, a VR experience for Cannes Lions Festival, 2016. The experience has since travelled to Art Basel Miami, Samsung 837 in New York and Phi Centre, Montreal. Believe Your Eyes was awarded a Silver Lion in the Entertainment category at Cannes 2017.

History of productions
 ANTIdiaRy, a 2016 collaboration with Samsung and international recording artist Rihanna to mark the launch of her eighth studio album ANTI. The project won a Bronze Lion in the Integrated Campaign Led By Promo & Activation category at the Cannes Lions International Festival of Creativity 2016.
 Sleep No More, a 2016 re-imagining of the London production in Shanghai. An adaptation of Shakespeare's Macbeth. Co-produced with Shanghai Media Group Live.
Believe Your Eyes, a 2016 VR experience commissioned by Samsung for the Cannes Lions International Festival of Creativity. Believe Your Eyes was awarded a Silver Lion in the Entertainment category at Cannes 2017.
The Guilty Party, a 2017 interactive experience commissioned by Turner Broadcasting System (TBS) and Civic Entertainment Group, USA for the launch of season two of Search Party.
The Burnt City is a production based around the fall of Troy, performed in Woolwich's Royal Arsenal, London in 2022.

The Third Day
The Third Day is a co-production between Sky Studios and HBO, in partnership with Plan B Entertainment, writer Dennis Kelly and Punchdrunk International. The six-part, one-hour episode limited series stars Jude Law as Sam, who after being drawn to a mysterious Island off the British Coast, is thrown into the unusual world of its secretive inhabitants. The Third Day will be the first original drama to be produced by Sky’s new production house, Sky Studios, aired in the US and the UK in 2020.

Punchdrunk Enrichment 
In 2008, Punchdrunk founded a new branch of the company focused on outreach to communities and schools called Punchdrunk Enrichment. Punchdrunk Enrichment projects are mostly aimed at children and young people.

Projects from Punchdrunk Enrichment include: 
 Under the Eiderdown (2009 - 2014), a theatrical experience in which school pupils are invited to visit a magical bric-a-brac shop, encouraging them to show an interest in creative writing.
Against Captain's Orders: A Journey into the Uncharted (2015), an immersive exhibition for children at the National Maritime Museum in London.
 Greenhive Green (2016), a project for Greenhive Care Home residents, including those with dementia, in partnership with Magic Me .
Small Wonders (2018 & 2019), a magical, interactive experience for children aged 5–11 years old and their families at Bernie Grant Arts Centre, Tottenham and Edinburgh International Children's Festival.

Fallow Cross 
In 2017, Punchdrunk opened Fallow Cross, a research and development space in Tottenham Hale.

Innovations
In a typical Punchdrunk production, audience members are free to roam the performance site, which can be as large as a five-story industrial warehouse. They can either follow the performers and themes (there are usually multiple threads at any instant), or simply explore the world of the performance, treating the production as a large art installation.

Masks are another signature element of Punchdrunk's work. Barret says when the company "...introduced masks, suddenly inhibition fell away and people found a sense of freedom in their anonymity, allowing them to fully explore their surroundings and become totally absorbed in the world around them."

Former Secretary of State for Culture James Purnell cited Punchdrunk as an example of "access and excellence" in modern British theatre.

Punchdrunk productions

The Cherry Orchard (2000), based on the play by Anton Chekhov
The Moonslave (2000), an experience that saw single audience members taken to an old mansion house by a masked chauffeur, following candlelit paths through a dense forest where the story unraveled.
The House of Oedipus (2000), an adaptation of Oedipus Rex and Antigone by Sophocles, staged in the garden of Poltimore House, Devon.
Midsummer Night's Dream (2002), an interactive, promenade reworking of the Shakespeare classic set in a private house and garden.
Chair (2002), an adaptation of Eugène Ionesco's The Chairs, performed in the Old Seager Distillery in Deptford.
The Tempest (2003), an adaptation of the play by Shakespeare, again performed at the Old Seagar Distillery, using its five floors to create a dark vision of Prospero's island.
Sleep No More (2003); see below for the 2009 and 2011 reinventions. An adaptation of Shakespeare's Macbeth in the style of a Hitchcock thriller, using reworked music from the soundtrack of classic Hitchcock films. Staged at the Beaufoy Building in London, an old Victorian school.
Woyzeck (2004), an adaptation of the play by Georg Buchner. Performed at the Big Chill Music Festival.
Marat/Sade (2005), an adaptation of the play by Peter Weiss. Performed at the 2005 Big Chill Music Festival.
The Firebird Ball (2005), inspired by Shakespeare's Romeo and Juliet and Stravinsky's ballet The Firebird. Staged at Offley Works, a disused factory in South London. The Firebird Ball ran for six weeks and received The Observer Review of the Year award for Best Out-of-Theatre Experience.
Faust (10 October 2006 until 31 March 2007), an adaptation of Goethe's Faust Part One, relocated to a small town in the 1950s Midwest. Staged across  of a derelict 5-storey archive building at 21 Wapping Lane in the London neighbourhood of Wapping. The production, which was presented by Punchdrunk and the National Theatre, earned the company a nomination for the Evening Standard Theatre Award for Most Promising Newcomer and won the 2006 Critics' Circle Theatre Award for Best Designer.
The Masque of the Red Death (play) (2007–8), a co-production with Battersea Arts Centre (BAC). An adaptation of stories by Edgar Allan Poe including "The Masque of the Red Death". Performed at the BAC from 5 October 2007 until 12 April 2008. While each performance culminated in a ball scene, Friday and Saturday night performances were followed by Red Death Lates, an elaborate after-party with interactive performance, celebrity guests, live bands and cabaret.
Tunnel 228 (2009), a collaboration with the Old Vic theatre, in the abandoned tunnels beneath London's Waterloo station.
Sleep No More, a 2009 reinvention in Boston of the 2003 London production. An adaptation of Shakespeare's Macbeth. Produced in association with the American Repertory Theatre at the Old Lincoln School in Brookline, Massachusetts.
It Felt Like A Kiss (2009). Commissioned by the Manchester International Festival and produced in collaboration with documentary filmmaker Adam Curtis and musician Damon Albarn at a deserted office block in Spinningfields, Manchester. It depicted "America's rise to power in the golden age of pop, and the nightmare that came back to haunt us all." The production won the Manchester Evening News Theatre Award for Best Special Entertainment. 
The Duchess of Malfi  (2010), an operatic adaptation of the play by John Webster with a score by Torsten Rasch. Produced in collaboration with English National Opera and performed in a vast, decommissioned pharmaceutical headquarters at London's Great Eastern Quay.
Sleep No More a 2011 reinvention in New York of the 2003 London production (also revived in Boston in 2009). Performed in disused warehouses at 530 W 27th Street in Manhattan, which was transformed into a faded hotel. Sleep No More won a Drama Desk Award for Unique Theatrical Experience and a Special Citation For Design And Choreography at the Obie Awards. 
The Crash of the Elysium, commissioned by Manchester International Festival, BBC, London 2012 Festival and Salford City Council. A 2011 one-hour show for children aged between 6 and 12, made in collaboration with the television series Doctor Who.
The Drowned Man: A Hollywood Fable (2013-2014), an adaptation of Woyzeck set in a sixties film studio, performed in a disused postal sorting office in Paddington, London. Presented by Punchdrunk and the National Theatre.
The Burnt City (2022-2023), a production based around the fall of Troy, performed in Woolwich's Royal Arsenal, London.

See also
 Site-specific theatre
 Postmodern theatre

References

Further reading

 Machon, Josephine. The Punchdrunk Encyclopaedia, Routledge (2018).
Biggin, Rose. "Immersive Theatre and Audience Experience Space, Game and Story in the Work of Punchdrunk" Palgrave Macmillan, Cham (2017)
 Machon, Josephine. Immersive Theatres: Intimacy and Immediacy in Contemporary Performance. London: Palgrave (2013).
 White, Gareth. "On Immersive Theatre". Theatre Research International 37.3 (2012): 221–35.
 Machon, Josephine. (Syn)aesthetics: Redefining Visceral Performance. London: Palgrave (2009).
 Oddey, Alison and Christine White (eds.). Modes of Spectating. Bristol: Intellect (2009).

External links 

 Sleep No More, Shanghai official homepage

Theatre companies in the United Kingdom
Installation art
Site-specific theatre
Immersive entertainment